Santo Amaro is a parish in the district of Velas in the Azores. The population in 2011 was 862, in an area of 22.53 km². It contains the localities Areias, Biscoitos, Boa Hora and Santo Amaro.

References

Freguesias of Velas